Blaenau Gwent is a county borough in the south-east of Wales. It borders the unitary authority areas of Monmouthshire and Torfaen to the east, Caerphilly to the west and Powys to the north. Its main towns are Abertillery, Brynmawr, Ebbw Vale and Tredegar.

Government
The borough was formed in 1974 as a local government district of Gwent. It covered the whole area of five former districts and a single parish from a sixth, which were all abolished at the same time:
Abertillery Urban District
Brynmawr Urban District
Ebbw Vale Urban District
Llanelly parish from Crickhowell Rural District
Nantyglo and Blaina Urban District
Tredegar Urban District
Brynmawr and Llanelly had been in the administrative county of Brecknockshire prior to the reforms, whilst the other areas had all been in the administrative county of Monmouthshire. Gwent County Council provided county-level services for the new borough.

The new borough was named Blaenau Gwent, meaning uplands of Gwent. The name had previously been an alternative name for the ancient parish of Aberystruth which had covered a large part of the area and had its parish church at Blaina.

Blaenau Gwent was reconstituted in 1996 as a county borough, taking over the county-level functions from the abolished Gwent County Council. At the same time Llanelly was transferred to the reconstituted Monmouthshire. The area is now governed by Blaenau Gwent County Borough Council, which is a principal council.

Politics
Blaenau Gwent hit the headlines at the 2005 UK General Election when an independent candidate, Peter Law, won the Westminster seat. He had resigned from the Labour Party after an internal party row following the retirement of incumbent MP Llew Smith, and defeated the official Labour candidate, Maggie Jones, by a margin of 9,121 votes. The seat had previously been held by Aneurin Bevan and Michael Foot, and was considered one of Labour's safest. Law died on 25 April 2006 and in the by-election, a former supporter of his, Dai Davies won, running as an independent candidate. Peter Law's widow, Trish Law, won his former Welsh Assembly seat, also running as an independent candidate. In 2007 she retained her seat. Dai Davies held the Westminster seat for the People's Voice from 2006 – 2010 when he lost his seat in a huge majority to Labour's Nick Smith of 10,516 votes. Alun Davies recaptured the seat for Labour at the Assembly elections in 2011 and then Labour won a landslide victory in the 2012 local elections taking 33 seats out of 42. Plaid Cymru nearly won the seat in the 2016 Assembly election, and Labour lost the council in the 2017 local elections.

Archaeology 
In February 2020, ancient cairns dated back to 4,500 year-old used to bury the leaders or chieftains of neolithic tribes people were revealed in the Cwmcelyn valley by the Aberystruth Archaeological Society.

"It is thousands of years old undoubtedly, and came at a time when people first started settling here in Wales, farming and working the land by clearing the heavily wooded mountain sides of the Gwent valleys. The site is also found opposite the huts, so there could be some connection, though we think this burial may even be from a slightly earlier period than that" said archaeologist Ian Fewings.

Education

Other information
In 2011 Blaenau Gwent had the highest level of severe child poverty in Wales, as revealed in statistical data published in a report by Save the Children.

According to the 2011 Census, 5.5% of the county's 67,348 (3,705 residents) resident-population can speak, read, and write Welsh, with 7.8%, or 5,284 residents, being able to speak Welsh.

Sport and Leisure

There are three Sports Centres located throughout the Borough offering swimming, sports courts and pitches. The sport centres are operated by Aneurin Leisure. 
They are located at: Abertillery, Ebbw Vale and Tredegar. 

There are many sports played in Blaenau Gwent these are a few:

Rugby

Blaenau Gwent has a rich and vibrant rugby history. There are many rugby union clubs throughout the borough. These are: 

Abertillery RFC/Blaenau Gwent RFC, 
Beaufort RFC
Blania RFC
Brynithel RFC
Brynmawr RFC
Ebbw Vale RFC
Llanhilleth RFC
Nantyglo RFC
Tredegar Ironsides RFC
Tredegar RFC
Trefil RFC
Cwm RFC

Football

The Football teams in Blaenau Gwent are:

Abertillery Bluebirds AFC
Abertillery Excelsiors A.F.C.
Beaufort Colts FC
Dukestown FC
Islwyn Junior FC
Nantyglo FC
RTB Ebbw Vale Football Club
Tredegar Town F.C.

Freedom of the Borough
The following people and military units have received the Freedom of the Borough of Blaenau Gwent.

Individuals
 Mark Williams : 14 March 2019.
 Eva Clarke : 26 January 2023.

Military Units
 The Royal Welsh: 19 February 2011.
 The Royal British Legion: 4 November 2021.

References

[] - Sport Centres Blaenau Gwent

External links

 Blaenau Gwent County Borough Council Home
 Channel 4's Kirstie and Phil's Best & Worst Places to Live on Blaenau Gwent
 WRU rugby clubs in Wales
  Sport Clubs in Blaenau Gwent

 
Principal areas of Wales
County boroughs of Wales
1974 establishments in Wales